Nicole Brown Simpson (née Brown; May 19, 1959 – June 12, 1994) was the ex-wife of the former professional American football player, O. J. Simpson, to whom she was married from 1985 to 1992.  She was the mother of their two children, Sydney and Justin.

Two years after her divorce from Simpson, Brown was stabbed to death at her Los Angeles home, on June 12, 1994, along with her friend, waiter Ron Goldman. O. J. Simpson, who had a history of physically abusing and making death threats toward Brown, was arrested and accused of both killings. Following a controversial and highly publicized criminal trial, which included evidence linking Simpson to the murders, Simpson was acquitted of all charges. He was later found liable for both deaths in a civil lawsuit in 1997.

Early life
Brown was born on May 19, 1959, in Frankfurt, West Germany, to Juditha Anne "Judy" Brown (née Baur, 1931–2020) and Louis Hezekiel "Lou" Brown, Jr. (1923–2014). Her mother was German, and her father was American. After moving to the United States, she attended Rancho Alamitos High School in Garden Grove, California. She graduated Dana Hills High School in Dana Point, California in 1976. She was a lifelong Roman Catholic.

Relationship with O. J. Simpson
Brown met the American football player O. J. Simpson in 1977, at the age of 18, when she was working as a waitress at a Beverly Hills private club, the Daisy. They began dating while Simpson was married to his first wife, Marguerite, who was pregnant with their daughter Aaren at the time. Simpson and Marguerite divorced in March 1979. Simpson and Brown married on February 2, 1985, five years after Simpson retired from professional football. Their marriage lasted seven years, during which time they had two children, Sydney and Justin.

During their marriage, Simpson physically abused Brown. According to a police report of an incident that occurred on New Year's Day in 1989, Simpson shouted: "I don't want that woman (Brown) sleeping in my bed anymore! I got two women, and I don't want that woman in my bed anymore." Brown called the police multiple times to report Simpson's abuse; he was arrested once, in 1989, after which he pleaded no contest to spousal abuse. However, Brown dropped the charges after her parents allegedly encouraged her to reconcile with Simpson, as Simpson provided her father with the opportunity to invest in a lucrative Hertz dealership, which was financially beneficial for the Brown family.

Brown filed for divorce on February 25, 1992, citing irreconcilable differences. At the time of their separation, Simpson informed Brown of a one-year ongoing extramarital affair he had with Tawny Kitaen, during which he gave her expensive jewelry; it ended when Kitaen married David Coverdale in 1989. Following the divorce, Simpson and Brown had a volatile relationship, but eventually reconciled. Audio released during the murder trial of O.J. Simpson revealed that Brown called 9-1-1 on October 25, 1993, crying and saying that Simpson was "going to beat the shit out of me". When the police arrived, Brown was secretly recorded by Sgt. Craig Lally. "He gets a very animalistic look in him," Brown stated. "All his veins pop out, his eyes are black and just black, I mean cold, like an animal. I mean very, very weird. And when I see it, it just scares me." Brown also stated Simpson had not hit her in four years. Several months after this incident, Brown moved out of their shared home and the relationship ended.

Death

At the time of her death, Brown resided at 875 South Bundy Drive in Brentwood, Los Angeles, California, with her two children. On the evening of Sunday, June 12, 1994, Brown, aged 35, was stabbed to death outside her home, along with 25-year-old restaurant waiter Ron Goldman. Her body was discovered shortly after midnight on June 13. She was lying in the fetal position in a pool of blood.

An autopsy determined that Brown had been stabbed seven times in the neck and scalp, and had sustained a 14 cm-long (5.5 inches) gash across her throat, which had severed both her left and right carotid arteries and breached her right and left jugular veins. The wound on Brown's neck penetrated 1.9 cm (0.75 inches) into her cervical vertebrae, nearly decapitating her. She also had defensive wounds on her hands.

Brown's funeral was held on June 16 at the St. Martin of Tours Catholic Church in Brentwood, California, with mourners including Simpson and their two children, members of Brown's family, Al Cowlings, house guest Kato Kaelin, and Steve Garvey. Brown is buried in Ascension Cemetery in Lake Forest, California.

Aftermath

O.J. Simpson was tried for the murders of both Brown and Goldman. In October 1995, after a public trial that lasted nearly nine months and presented both circumstantial and physical evidence that Simpson had killed both victims, he was controversially acquitted.  In a 1997 civil trial filed by Fred Goldman, Ron Goldman's father, a jury found him liable for the wrongful deaths of Brown and Goldman and awarded $33.5 million in damages to the Goldmans. Simpson would later be incarcerated for an unrelated armed robbery at a Las Vegas hotel in 2008.

In 1996, after the conclusion of the trial, a judge granted Simpson's petition to give him full custody of Sydney and Justin. Brown's parents continued unsuccessfully to fight for custody. Following the deaths of Brown and Goldman, the townhouse at the site of their killing, 875 South Bundy Drive, sat empty for two years, until the next owner extensively remodeled it and had the address changed. Filmmaker Ezra Edelman, who directed the documentary O.J.: Made in America, dedicated his Academy Award for Best Documentary Feature to both Brown and Goldman in his acceptance speech.

The Nicole Brown Simpson Foundation was established in 1994 in her memory. Later renamed the Nicole Brown Charitable Foundation, it reportedly cut back on grantmaking in 1999, due to a drop in donations and questionable management practices.

Portrayals
Jessica Tuck portrayed Brown in the 1995 television movie The O. J. Simpson Story. Brown was portrayed by Sandra Olson in Reenactment of the Century. In 2013, it was announced Charlotte Kirk would portray Brown in Nicole & O.J.. Mena Suvari portrayed Brown in the 2019 film The Murder of Nicole Brown Simpson.

References

Citations

Sources

External links
 Court TV's complete coverage of the O. J. Simpson murder case.

1959 births
1994 deaths
1994 murders in the United States
20th-century German people
20th-century German women
Burials in Orange County, California
Deaths by stabbing in California
Female murder victims
German emigrants to the United States
German murder victims
German people of American descent
German people murdered abroad
Incidents of violence against women
O. J. Simpson murder case
People from Brentwood, Los Angeles
People from Frankfurt
People murdered in Los Angeles